Trematochromis benthicola is a ray-finned fish species in the cichlid family (Cichlidae), subfamily Pseudocrenilabrinae and the tribe Haplochromini. It is found throughout Lake Tanganyika in the Burundian, the Democratic Republic of the Congo, Tanzanian, and Zambian shoreline. Its preferred habitat are the hidden recesses of caves in shallow water.

This species was described in 1962. At the time of its discovery placed in Haplochromis – then a "wastebin genus" for Haplochromini cichlids –, it was subsequently moved to Ctenochromis, but differs somewhat from the fishes otherwise placed there.<ref name = Takahashi>{{cite journal | author1 = T. Takahashi | author2 = J. Snoeks | author3 = K. Nakaya | name-list-style = amp | year = 2006 | title = Trematochromis schreyeni Poll, 1987, a junior synonym of Ctenochromis' benthicola (Matthes, 1962)(Perciformes: Cichlidae) from Lake Tanganyika | journal = Journal of Fish Biology | volume = 68 | pages = 56–67| doi = 10.1111/j.0022-1112.2006.00969.x }} Abstract</ref> Consequently, it has been proposed for separation in a monotypic genus Trematochromis''', which was established in 1987 when "C." benthicola'' was mistakenly described a second time.

References

Haplochromini
Fish of Lake Tanganyika
Fish described in 1962
Taxa named by Hubert Matthes
Taxonomy articles created by Polbot
Taxobox binomials not recognized by IUCN